Gangneung–Wonju National University (GWNU) is a national research university in Gangneung and Wonju in Korea. Founded in 1946, GWNU is situated on the East coast of South Korea has risen to one of the  research universities in South Korea.

Following the merger between Kangnung National University and Wonju National College on March 1, 2007, the name of the university changed to Gangneung–Wonju National University. It is recognized as one of the preeminent research universities, ranked 1st among Korean universities and 6th among Asian universities in the number of research papers in the 2009 Asia QS Universities Evaluation.

Situated near the Sea of Japan (East Sea) coastal region, GWNU has taken advantage of its location, focusing its education on new materials, marine resources, tourism and information technology.  In addition, the university, as a global exchange hub-university linking the East Asian region, has formed academic agreements with 27 countries, 73 foreign universities, pursuing academic exchanges with students, faculties and staff and is growing into an international research institution in the growing global community. Currently, GWNU has about 150 international students from China, Russia, Japan, South-east Asia and the United States.

Brief history 
 1946. 11. 11 Kangnung College of Education opened
 1968. 03. 28 Kangnung Teacher's College opened
 1978. 03. 01 Kangnung Junior College opened
 1979. 03. 14 Kangnung National College opened
 1983. 02. 26 Change of address from Chodang-dong to Jibyeon
 1991. 03. 01 Promotion to Kangnung National University
 1997. 12. 23 Kangnung National University College of Dentistry Clinic opened
 2006. 11. 11 60th anniversary of opening
 2007. 03. 01 Union with Wonju National College
 2008. 08. 25 Selected as an excellent human resource training university in 2008
 2009. 03. 01 Renamed as Gangneung–Wonju National University
 2009. 05. 12 Asian University Evaluation 1st place in ‘number of citations per thesis’ in Korea, 6th in Asia
 2009. 06. 11 Selected as a second phase university-industry cooperation promotion university
 2010. 05. 17 4th place in Korea and 22nd Asia among small and medium-sized universities at 2010 Asia University Evaluation
 2011. 02. 22 Graduation ceremony for the 2010 academic year, the first graduate after integration
 2011. 03. 22 Opening ceremony for Wonju campus lecture and research hall
 2012. 04. 01 Selected as Leader in University-Industry Cooperation Project (LINC)
 2012. 05. 23 Opened Trekking ‘Hakisi Seupji-gil’ (Bau-gil section 16)
 2013. 03. 16 Poened Gangneung–Wonju National University PR center
 2013. 07. 30 Selected as a university education capacity enhancement project in 2013
 2013. 11. 01 Opening ceremony of Industry-Academic Cooperation Center
 2014. 05. 08 Selected as second phase Leader in University-Industry Cooperation Project (LINC)
 2014. 07. 01 Selected for Specialization Project for Regional University (Ck-1) (Largest support in Gangwon-do, ~2018)
 2014. 08. 01 Selected as the best university innovation support project in Korea (3 consecutive year by 2016)
 2016. 06. 16 1st place in Korea and 36th in Asia among small and medium-sized universities that do not have medical school at 2016 Asian University Evaluation
 2016. 11. 11 70th anniversary

Academics

Undergraduate 
55 departments in 9 colleges

Gangneng Campus
 College of Humanities
 College of Social Science
 College of Natural Science
 College of Life Science
 College of Engineering
 College of Arts & Physical Education
 College of Dentistry

Wonju Campus
 College of Health and Welfare
 College of Science and Technology

Graduate school 
GWNU running 1 graduate school, 3 Professional graduate school.

 Master program - provides 39 departments, 3 contract departments, 5 cooperative processes at Gangneung campus. Wonju campus has 13 departments, 1 contract department.
 Master program at professional graduate school - 3 schools provide 39 departments at Gangneung campus, 18 departments at Wonju campus.
 Doctorate program - provides 30 departments, 3 contract departments, 1 cooperative process at Gangneung campus. Wonju Campus has 10 departments.
 Graduate School
 Graduate School of Management and Policy Science
 Graduate School of Education
 Graduate School of Industry

International Student Program 
GWNU has Korean Language School for international students. Duration is 10 weeks, 200 hours. Class starts at 10:10 AM, over at 3:00 PM.

Curriculum for Regular Course

Campus life 
Gangneung is a city of Coffee & 2018 Winter Olympics. The city is close to sea of Japan (East sea). Wonju is the greatest city in Gangwon Province. And city is the Mecca of medical.

Principal, Dean and President

Principal 
1st Won, Henggyun2nd You, Jeongso3rd Youn, Ilseon4th Kim, Changbko5th Youn, Wonsik6th O, Hyogeun

Dean 
Kangneung School of Education
1st Rye, Sungryeol2nd-3rd Kim, Byeongo

Kangneung Junior College
1st Kim, Byeongo

Kangneung College
1st Kang, Yeonseon2nd-3rd Choi, Jihoon4th Kang, Gyuseok

President 
Kangneung National University
1st Lee, Chamsu2nd-3rd Kang, Gyuseok4th Lim, Seongdal5th Han, Song

Gangenung-Wonju National University
1st Han, Song2nd Jeon, Banguk3rd Ban, Seonsup

See also
List of national universities in South Korea
List of universities and colleges in South Korea
Education in Korea

References

External links 
 Gangneung-Wonju National University 
 Gangneung-Wonju National University 
 Center for International Exchange & cooperation of GWNU

 
Universities and colleges in Gangwon Province, South Korea
Buildings and structures in Gangneung
Education in Wonju
Educational institutions established in 1946
1946 establishments in Korea
National universities and colleges in South Korea